Forever is a 2013 Philippine television drama romance fantasy series broadcast by GMA Network. Directed by Ricky Davao, it stars Heart Evangelista, Geoff Eigenmann and Gloria Romero. It premiered on January 21, 2013 on the network's Telebabad line up replacing Magdalena. The series concluded on April 19, 2013 with a total of 63 episodes.

Cast and characters

Lead cast
 Heart Evangelista as young Adora Del Prado / Isadora
 Gloria Romero as older Adora Del Prado
 Geoff Eigenmann as Ramon / Patrick

Supporting cast
 Isabel Oli as Monica del Prado
 Gian Magdangal as Rico Gallardo III
 Candy Pangilinan as Susie
 Saab Magalona as Leila

Guest cast
 Marc Abaya as Federico Gallardo
 Ernie Zarate as older Federico Gallardo
 Ronnie Henares as Jaime Del Prado
 Angie Ferro as Apeng
 Rox Montealegre as Maggie
 Dex Quindoza as Jason
 Roldan Aquino as Barabas
 Carme Sanchez as Kate

Production and development
Writer, director and GMA Entertainment TV head, Jun Lana began conceptualizing the series early 2012 and intended to be the initial offering of the network's for their coveted Afternoon Prime block for 2013. The series is, somewhat, based on the 1980 classic film Somewhere in Time and in 2006 GMA Films' Moments of Love, because of its fictitious "Love knows no boundaries" and "time warf" plot. The network’s entertainment TV department approved the concept and found the story "something new" for an afternoon show to feature a period piece.

Ratings
According to AGB Nielsen Philippines' Mega Manila household television ratings, the pilot episode of Forever earned a 15.3% rating. While the final episode scored a 12.4% rating.

References

External links
 

2013 Philippine television series debuts
2013 Philippine television series endings
Filipino-language television shows
GMA Network drama series
Philippine romance television series
Television shows set in the Philippines